Karen Barbara Lee (born 1 January 1983) is an English former competitive swimmer who represented Great Britain in the Olympics and European championships.  She specialized in backstroke events.  She finished sixth in the 200-metre backstroke (2.10.27) at the 2002 European Short Course Swimming Championships in Riesa, Germany.  She was also a member of Team GB starting in 1998, and a varsity swimmer for the Loughborough University team, under head coach Ben Titley.

Lee qualified for the women's 200-metre backstroke, as a member of Team GB, at the 2004 Summer Olympics in Athens.  She finished second behind Katy Sexton (2:11.48) at the British Olympic Trials by 0.38 of a second, in a FINA A-standard of 2:11.86.  She challenged seven other swimmers in heat four, including Germany's Antje Buschschulte and Russia's Stanislava Komarova, both of whom were top medal favorites.  She faded to seventh place by a 5.39-second margin behind winner Komarova in 2:16.10.  Lee missed the semifinals by nearly one second, as she placed twentieth overall in the preliminaries.

References

External links
Profile – British Amateur Swimming Federation

1983 births
Living people
English female swimmers
Olympic swimmers of Great Britain
Swimmers at the 2004 Summer Olympics
Female backstroke swimmers
Sportspeople from Bristol
20th-century English women
21st-century English women